Paul Jeffrey Foerster (born November 19, 1963 in Rangely, Colorado) is an American sailor.

He received All-American honors three times from the Inter-Collegiate Sailing Association sailing for the University of Texas at Austin and competed at four Olympic Games in sailing: 1988, 1992, 2000, and 2004, winning total of three Olympic medals during his career. In the Flying Dutchman (FD) class he was successful with Stephen Bourdow (Silver 1992), and then in the 470 Class with Bob Merrick (silver, 2000) and Kevin Burnham (gold, 2004).

He now sails from Rush Creek Yacht Club in Heath, Texas on Lake Ray Hubbard east of Dallas, Texas.  Foerster was inducted into the National Sailing Hall of Fame in 2015.

References

External links
 
 
 

1963 births
Living people
American male sailors (sport)
Olympic gold medalists for the United States in sailing
Olympic silver medalists for the United States in sailing
Sailors at the 1988 Summer Olympics – Flying Dutchman
Sailors at the 1992 Summer Olympics – Flying Dutchman
Sailors at the 2000 Summer Olympics – 470
Sailors at the 2004 Summer Olympics – 470
Medalists at the 2004 Summer Olympics
Medalists at the 2000 Summer Olympics
Medalists at the 1992 Summer Olympics
Pan American Games silver medalists for the United States
Pan American Games medalists in sailing
Pan American Games bronze medalists for the United States
Sailors at the 2007 Pan American Games
Sailors at the 2011 Pan American Games
Medalists at the 2007 Pan American Games
Medalists at the 2011 Pan American Games
Flying Dutchman class world champions
People from Rangely, Colorado
Snipe class sailors
Sunfish class world champions
Texas Longhorns sailors
US Sailor of the Year
World champions in sailing for the United States